Sablale District is a district in the southeastern Lower Shabelle (Shabeellaha Hoose) region of Somalia. Its capital lies at Sablale. The broader Sablale District has a total population of 143,055 residents.

References

External links
 Districts of Somalia
 Administrative map of Sablale District

Districts of Somalia

Lower Shabelle